Anthistarcha is a genus of moth in the family Gelechiidae.

Species
 Anthistarcha binocularis Meyrick, 1929
 Anthistarcha geniatella Busck, 1914

References

Chelariini
Moth genera